Helwak is a town on the Chiplun–Karad highway in the state of Maharashtra, India just off the Kumbharli Ghat.

Cities and towns in Satara district